Acacia xanthocarpa is a shrub belonging to the genus Acacia and the subgenus Juliflorae that is endemic to aris parts of western Australia.

Description
The plant often has contorted trunks and main branches with grey coloured bark that is often fissured on the main trunks. The sparsely haired branchlets become glabrous with age. Like many species of Acacia it has phyllodes rather than true leaves. The phyllodes are densely haired when immature that soon become glabrescent or hairs persisting in grooves between the many thin parallel nerves. It blooms from July to August and produces yellow flowers and yellow fruit.

Distribution
It is native to a small area in the Mid West and Goldfields regions of Western Australia where it is usually situated along drainage lines, on plains and on rocky hills.

See also
List of Acacia species

References

xanthocarpa
Acacias of Western Australia
Plants described in 1995
Taxa named by Bruce Maslin
Taxa named by Richard Sumner Cowan